The 10th Satellite Awards, honoring the best in film and television of 2005, were given on December 17, 2005.

Special achievement awards
Auteur Award (for his work on the film Good Night, and Good Luck and his promising filmmaking future) – George Clooney

Mary Pickford Award (for outstanding contribution to the entertainment industry) – Gena Rowlands

Nikola Tesla Award (for his special effects contributions to cinema) – Stan Winston

Outstanding New Talent – Rupert Friend

Motion picture winners and nominees

Best Actor – Drama
 Philip Seymour Hoffman – Capote
Jake Gyllenhaal – Jarhead
Tommy Lee Jones – The Three Burials of Melquiades Estrada
Heath Ledger – Brokeback Mountain
Viggo Mortensen – A History of Violence
David Strathairn – Good Night, and Good Luck

Best Actor – Musical or Comedy
 Terrence Howard – Hustle & Flow
Kevin Costner – The Upside of Anger
Robert Downey Jr. – Kiss Kiss Bang Bang
Cillian Murphy – Breakfast on Pluto
Bill Murray – Broken Flowers
Joaquin Phoenix – Walk the Line

Best Actress – Drama
 Felicity Huffman – Transamerica
Toni Collette – In Her Shoes
Julianne Moore – The Prize Winner of Defiance, Ohio
Robin Wright Penn – Nine Lives
Charlize Theron – North Country
Ziyi Zhang – Memoirs of a Geisha

Best Actress – Musical or Comedy
 Reese Witherspoon – Walk the Line
Joan Allen – The Upside of Anger
Claire Danes – Shopgirl
Judi Dench – Mrs Henderson Presents
Keira Knightley – Pride & Prejudice
Joan Plowright – Mrs. Palfrey at the Claremont

Best Animated or Mixed Media Film
 The Chronicles of Narnia: The Lion, the Witch and the Wardrobe 
Chicken Little
Corpse Bride
Howl's Moving Castle (Hauru no ugoku shiro)
Wallace & Gromit: The Curse of the Were-Rabbit

Best Art Direction and Production Design
 Good Night, and Good Luck
Kingdom of Heaven
Memoirs of a Geisha
Modigliani
Sin City
Star Wars: Episode III – Revenge of the Sith

Best Cinematography
 The Constant Gardener – César Charlone
2046 – Christopher Doyle
Charlie and the Chocolate Factory – Philippe Rousselot
Kung Fu Hustle (Kung fu) – Poon Hang-Sang
Memoirs of a Geisha – Dion Beebe
Sin City – Robert Rodriguez

Best Costume Design
 Pride & Prejudice
Harry Potter and the Goblet of Fire
Kingdom of Heaven
Memoirs of a Geisha
Modigliani
The White Countess

Best Director
 Ang Lee – Brokeback Mountain
George Clooney – Good Night, and Good Luck
Chris Columbus – Rent
James Mangold – Walk the Line
Rob Marshall – Memoirs of a Geisha
Bennett Miller – Capote

Best Documentary Film
 Mad Hot Ballroom
Enron: The Smartest Guys in the Room
Favela Rising
March of the Penguins (La marche de l'empereur)
Murderball
New York Doll

Best Editing
 Brokeback Mountain
Good Night, and Good Luck
Jarhead
Kung Fu Hustle (Kung fu)
Sin City
War of the Worlds

Best Film – Drama
 Brokeback Mountain
Capote
Cinderella Man
A History of Violence
Memoirs of a Geisha
The War Within

Best Film – Musical or Comedy
 Walk the Line
Happy Endings
Hustle & Flow
Kung Fu Hustle (Kung fu)
Rent
Shopgirl

Best Foreign Language Film
 Äideistä parhain (Mother of Mine), Finland/Sweden
2046, China/France/Germany/Hong Kong
Innocent Voices, Mexico/Puerto Rico/United States
Lila Says, France/UK
Turtles Can Fly, France/Iran/Iraq
Walk on Water, Israel/Sweden

Best Original Score
 "Kingdom of Heaven" – Harry Gregson-Williams
"Brokeback Mountain" – Gustavo Santaolalla
"The Constant Gardener" – Alberto Iglesias
"Corpse Bride" – Danny Elfman
"Memoirs of a Geisha" – John Williams
"Sin City" – Robert Rodriguez

Best Original Song
 "A Love That Will Never Grow Old" performed by Emmylou Harris – Brokeback Mountain
"In the Deep" performed by Bird York – Crash
"Hustler's Ambition" performed by 50 Cent – Get Rich or Die Tryin'
"Magic Works" – Harry Potter and the Goblet of Fire
"Broken" – Kiss Kiss Bang Bang

Best Screenplay – Adapted
 Memoirs of a Geisha – Robin Swicord
Brokeback Mountain – Larry McMurtry and Diana Ossana
Capote – Dan Futterman
Jarhead – William Broyles Jr.
Shopgirl – Steve Martin
Walk the Line – Gill Dennis and James Mangold

Best Screenplay – Original
 Good Night, and Good Luck – George Clooney and Grant Heslov
Crash – Paul Haggis and Bobby Moresco
Happy Endings – Don Roos
Nine Lives – Rodrigo García
The Squid and the Whale – Noah Baumbach
The War Within – Ayad Akhtar, Joseph Castelo, and Tom Glynn

Best Sound
 Star Wars: Episode III – Revenge of the Sith
Kung Fu Hustle (Kung fu)
Rent
Sin City
The White Countess

Best Supporting Actor – Drama
 Danny Huston – The Constant Gardener
Chris Cooper – Capote
Jake Gyllenhaal – Brokeback Mountain
Edward Norton – Kingdom of Heaven
Mickey Rourke – Sin City
Peter Sarsgaard – Jarhead

Best Supporting Actor – Musical or Comedy
 Val Kilmer – Kiss Kiss, Bang Bang
Tom Arnold – Happy Endings
Corbin Bernsen – Kiss Kiss Bang Bang
Steve Coogan – Happy Endings
Craig T. Nelson – The Family Stone
Jason Schwartzman – Shopgirl

Best Supporting Actress – Drama
 Laura Linney – The Squid and the Whale
Amy Adams – Junebug
Maria Bello – A History of Violence
Li Gong – Memoirs of a Geisha
Shirley MacLaine – In Her Shoes
Frances McDormand – North Country

Best Supporting Actress – Musical or Comedy
 Rosario Dawson – Rent
America Ferrera – The Sisterhood of the Traveling Pants
Diane Keaton – The Family Stone
Rachel McAdams – The Family Stone
Michelle Monaghan – Kiss Kiss Bang Bang
Qiu Yuen – Kung Fu Hustle (Kung fu)

Best Visual Effects
 Star Wars: Episode III – Revenge of the Sith
Kingdom of Heaven
Kung Fu Hustle (Kung fu)
Sin City
War of the Worlds

Outstanding Motion Picture Ensemble
Crash

Television winners and nominees

Best Actor – Drama Series
 Hugh Laurie – House, M.D.
Denis Leary – Rescue Me
Ian McShane – Deadwood
Dylan Walsh – Nip/Tuck
Jake Weber – Medium

Best Actor – Musical or Comedy Series
 Jason Bateman – Arrested Development
Stephen Colbert – The Colbert Report
Kevin Connolly – Entourage
Jason Lee – My Name Is Earl
Tony Shalhoub – Monk
James Spader – Boston Legal

Best Actor – Miniseries or TV Film
 Jonathan Rhys Meyers – Elvis
Kenneth Branagh – Warm Springs
Christian Campbell – Reefer Madness: The Movie Musical
Ted Danson – Our Fathers
Rupert Everett – Sherlock Holmes and the Case of the Silk Stocking
Ed Harris – Empire Falls

Best Actress – Drama Series
 Kyra Sedgwick – The Closer
Patricia Arquette – Medium
Jennifer Beals – The L Word
Kristen Bell – Veronica Mars
Geena Davis – Commander in Chief
Joely Richardson – Nip/Tuck

Best Actress – Musical or Comedy Series
 Felicity Huffman – Desperate Housewives (TIE)  Mary-Louise Parker – Weeds (TIE)
Candice Bergen – Boston Legal
Lauren Graham – Gilmore Girls
Elizabeth Perkins – Weeds

Best Actress – Miniseries or TV Film
 Kristen Bell – Reefer Madness: The Movie Musical
Natascha McElhone – Revelations
Geraldine McEwan – Agatha Christie's Marple
S. Epatha Merkerson – Lackawanna Blues
Cynthia Nixon – Warm Springs
Keri Russell – The Magic of Ordinary Days

Best Miniseries
 Elvis
Agatha Christie's Marple
Empire Falls
Into the West
Revelations
The Virgin Queen

Best Series – Drama
 House, M.D.
Grey's Anatomy
Lost
Nip/Tuck
Rescue Me
Rome

Best Series – Musical or Comedy
 The Daily Show with Jon Stewart
Boston Legal
The Colbert Report
Entourage
My Name Is Earl

Best Supporting Actor – Miniseries or TV Film
 Randy Quaid – Elvis
Tim Blake Nelson – Warm Springs
Paul Newman – Empire Falls
Ruben Santiago-Hudson – Their Eyes Were Watching God
William Shatner – Boston Legal

Best Supporting Actress – Miniseries or TV Film
 Lisa Edelstein – House, M.D.
Shohreh Aghdashloo – 24
Jane Alexander – Warm Springs
Camryn Manheim – Elvis
Sandra Oh – Grey's Anatomy
Polly Walker – Rome

Best TV Film
 Reefer Madness: The Movie Musical
Kidnapped
Lackawanna Blues
The Magic of Ordinary Days
Our Fathers
Sometimes in April
Warm Springs

Outstanding Television Ensemble
Rescue Me

New Media winners and nominees

Best Classic DVD
The Wizard of Oz Three Disc Collector's Edition.
Airplane! "Don't Call Me Shirley" Edition.
Cat People, The Curse of the Cat People, I Walked with a Zombie, The Body Snatcher, Isle of the Dead, Bedlam, The Leopard Man, The Ghost Ship, The Seventh Victim, and Shadows in the Dark: The Val Lewton Legacy
The Devil's Rejects Unrated Widescreen Edition.
Gladiator Extended Edition.
King Kong, The Son of Kong, and Mighty Joe Young For the King Kong Collection (2-Disc Special Edition).
The Man with the Golden Arm 50th Anniversary Edition.
Pickpocket
Saboteur, Shadow of a Doubt, Rope, Rear Window, The Trouble with Harry, The Man Who Knew Too Much, Vertigo, Psycho, The Birds, Marnie, Torn Curtain, Topaz, Frenzy, and Family Plot For Alfred Hitchcock: The Masterpiece Collection.
Seven Men from Now Special Collector's Edition.
The Sound of Music 40th Anniversary Edition.
Titanic Special Collector's Edition.
Top Hat, Swing Time, Follow the Fleet, Shall We Dance, and The Barkleys of Broadway For the Astaire and Rogers Collection, Vol. 1.

Best Documentary DVD
Mad Hot Ballroom
The Concert for Bangladesh Limited Collector's Edition
Kinsey Two-Disc Special Edition
March of the Penguins
American Experience For episode "Mary Pickford (#17.6)".
Murderball
No Direction Home: Bob Dylan
Rize
The Wild Parrots of Telegraph Hill

Best DVD Extras
Titanic Special Collector's Edition.
Airplane! "Don't Call Me Shirley" Edition.
The Big Lebowski Widescreen Collector's Edition.
Crash Widescreen Edition.
King Kong, The Son of Kong, and Mighty Joe Young For the King Kong Collection (2-Disc Special Edition).
Office Space Special Edition With Flair!
Oldboy
Saw Uncut Edition.
Sin City Re-Cut & Extended Edition.
The Wizard of Oz Three Disc Collector's Edition.

Best DVD Release of TV Shows
24 For Season Four.
Curb Your Enthusiasm Complete Fourth Season.
Deadwood Complete First Season.
Desperate Housewives Complete First Season.
Entourage Complete First Season.
House, M.D. For Season One.
The L Word Complete Second Season.
Lost Complete First Season.
Rescue Me Complete First Season.
Seinfeld For Season 6.
The Simpsons Complete Seventh Season (Collectible Marge Head Pack).
South Park Complete Sixth Season.

Outstanding Game Based on a Previous Medium
X-Men Legends II: Rise of Apocalypse
Æon Flux
Charlie and the Chocolate Factory
Chicken Little
Ed, Edd n Eddy: The Mis-Edventures
The Incredibles: Rise of the Underminer
King Kong: The Official Game of the Movie
Star Wars: Battlefront II
Star Wars: Episode III – Revenge of the Sith

Outstanding Overall DVD
From the Earth to the Moon Signature Edition.
Batman Begins Two-Disc Deluxe Edition With Comic Book.
The Big Lebowski Widescreen Collector's Edition.
Cinderella Man Widescreen Collector's Edition.
The Crying Game Collector's Edition.
Jaws Widescreen 30th Anniversary Collection.
Office Space Special Edition With Flair!
Sin City Re-Cut & Extended Edition.
Star Wars: Episode III – Revenge of the Sith Widescreen Edition.
Titanic Special Collector's Edition.
War of the Worlds 2-Disc Limited Edition.
The Wizard of Oz Three Disc Collector's Edition.

Outstanding Platform Action/Adventure Game
Mortal Kombat: Shaolin Monks
Area 51
Battlefield 2: Modern Combat
Call of Duty 2
Death by Degrees
Oddworld: Stranger's Wrath
Psychonauts
Tak: The Great Juju Challenge

Outstanding Puzzle/Strategy Game
Pump It Up: Exceed SE
Black & White 2
The Sims 2

Outstanding Sports/Fighting/Racing Game
Burnout Revenge
187 Ride or Die
Blitz: The League
L.A. Rush
NBA Street Volume 3
Tekken 5

Outstanding Youth DVD
Toy Story 2 2-Disc Special Edition.
Bambi Disney Special Platinum Edition.
Charlie and the Chocolate Factory 2-Disc Deluxe Edition.
Cinderella 2-Disc Special Edition.
Madagascar Widescreen Edition.
The Muppet Movie For Kermit's 50th Anniversary Edition.
The Sisterhood of the Traveling Pants Widescreen Edition.
The Sound of Music 40th Anniversary Edition.
The Wizard of Oz Three Disc Collector's Edition.

Awards breakdown

Film
Winners:
4 / 8 Brokeback Mountain: Best Director & Editing / Best Film – Drama / Best Original Song
2 / 3 The Constant Gardener: Best Cinematography / Best Supporting Actor – Drama
2 / 3 Star Wars: Episode III – Revenge of the Sith: Best Sound & Visual Effects
2 / 5 Good Night, and Good Luck: Best Art Direction and Production Design / Best Screenplay – Original
2 / 5 Walk the Line: Best Actress & Film – Musical or Comedy
1 / 1 Mother of Mine (Äideistä parhain): Best Foreign Language Film
1 / 1 The Chronicles of Narnia: The Lion, the Witch and the Wardrobe: Best Animated or Mixed Media Film
1 / 1 Mad Hot Ballroom: Best Documentary Film
1 / 1 Transamerica: Best Actress – Drama
1 / 2 Hustle & Flow: Best Actor – Musical or Comedy
1 / 2 Pride & Prejudice: Best Costume Design
1 / 2 The Squid and the Whale: Best Supporting Actress – Drama
1 / 3 Crash: Outstanding Motion Picture Ensemble
1 / 4 Rent: Best Supporting Actress – Musical or Comedy
1 / 5 Capote: Best Actor – Drama
1 / 5 Kingdom of Heaven: Best Original Score
1 / 5 Kiss Kiss Bang Bang: Best Supporting Actor – Musical or Comedy
1 / 9 Memoirs of a Geisha: Best Screenplay – Adapted

Losers:
0 / 7 Sin City
0 / 6 Kung Fu Hustle (Kung fu)
0 / 4 Happy Endings, Jarhead, Shopgirl
0 / 3 The Family Stone, A History of Violence
0 / 2 2046, Corpse Bride, Harry Potter and the Goblet of Fire, In Her Shoes, Modigliani, Nine Lives, North Country, The Upside of Anger, War of the Worlds, The War Within, The White Countess

Television
Winners:
3 / 3 House, M.D.: Best Actor – Drama Series / Best Series – Drama / Best Supporting Actress – Miniseries or TV Film
3 / 4 Elvis: Best Actor – Miniseries or TV Film / Best Miniseries / Best Supporting Actor – Miniseries or TV Film
2 / 3 Reefer Madness: The Movie Musical: Best Actress – Miniseries or TV Film / Best TV Film
1 / 1 Arrested Development: Best Actor – Musical or Comedy Series
1 / 1 The Closer: Best Actress – Drama Series
1 / 1 The Daily Show with Jon Stewart: Best Series – Musical or Comedy Series
1 / 1 Desperate Housewives: Best Actress – Musical or Comedy Series
1 / 1 Weeds: Best Actress – Musical or Comedy Series
1 / 3 Rescue Me: Outstanding Television Ensemble

Losers:
0 / 5 Warm Springs
0 / 4 Boston Legal
0 / 3 Empire Falls, Nip/Tuck
0 / 2 Agatha Christie's Marple, The Colbert Report, Entourage, Grey's Anatomy, Lackawanna Blues, The Magic of Ordinary Days, Medium, My Name Is Earl, Our Fathers, Revelations, Rome

References

Satellite Awards ceremonies
2005 awards
2005 film awards
2005 television awards